The Island of the Dolls is a chinampa of the Laguna de Tequila located in the channels of Xochimilco, south of the center of Mexico City, Mexico. It is a popular tourist attraction due to dolls of various styles and colors being found throughout the island. They were originally placed by the former owner of the island, Julián Santana Barrera, who died from a heart attack in 2001. He believed that dolls helped to chase away the spirit of a girl who drowned years ago.

History 

The Island of the Dolls, originally owned by Don Julián Santana Barrera, is full of dolls hanging from trees and buildings covered with cobwebs and insects. The place was named in the 1950s when the dolls started randomly appearing on the island. Santana was a neighbor of the Barrio de la Asunción, where he used to go to drink pulque after selling his vegetables, until he began preaching the Bible due to superstitions, which led to him being expelled from the sector.

According to a legend, a young girl drowned entangled among the lilies of the canal and her body was found on the banks of the Santampa chinampas. Santana claimed to have heard the girl crying out "I want my doll" and, terrified, hung up the doll he found near the girl's body. After the event, every time he went outside, he claims to have found a new doll hanging from one of the trees. He later died in the same spot the girl drowned. Many believe that his death was caused by the girl's spirit, which still haunts the island.

In 1987, an eco-tourist rescue was made and the island was found covered with water lily. After the death of Santana, the chinampa became a tourist attraction. The place began gaining fame in 1943, when Mexican filmmaker Emilio Fernández filmed María Candelaria there. A significant number of international and local channels have featured articles on the island, including The Huffington Post, Travel Channel and ABC News.

The dolls are still on the island, which is accessible by boat. The island was featured on the Travel Channel show Ghost Adventures, the Amazon Prime show Lore and was also featured on BuzzFeed Unsolved. Shane Madej, a firm skeptic of the paranormal, has asserted that he believes in the legends about the island. The Island was also used for the episode "" (season one, episode 10) of the Spanish TV comedy  for Televisa, where the main characters Vítor and Albertano are left behind on the island by an irritated Doña Cuca, and as night falls, they are rescued by the local emergency crews and end up on the news.

Access to the island 

The Island of the Dolls is an hour and a half from Embarcadero Cuemanco. The only access is via trajinera. Most rowers are willing to transport people to the island, but there are those who refuse due to superstitions. The journey, approximately one hour, includes a tour of the Ecological Area, Ajolote Museum, Apatlaco Canal, Teshuilo Lagoon and Llorona Island.

In addition to hundreds of dolls, the island also contains a small museum with articles from local newspapers about both the island and the previous owner. There is a store and three rooms, one of which seems to have been used as a bedroom. In this room you can see the first doll that Santana collected as well as Agustinita, his favorite doll. Some of the visitors place offerings around the dolls in exchange for miracles and blessings, and some others change their clothes and maintain it as a form of worship.

References

External links 
 Terror on Doll Island - Expedition X - Discovery Channel
 La isla de las muñecas (1998) - IMDb
 Island of the Dead Dolls, Parque Ecológico de Xochimilco 16036 Mexico City, CDMX Mexico - Google Maps
 Escape to the Island of the Dolls - Ripley's Believe It or Not!

Islands of Mexico
Reportedly haunted locations in Mexico
Supernatural legends
Dolls